Irving School is a former school building in Duluth, Minnesota, United States.  It operated as a school from its construction in 1895 until 1982, when it was closed due to declining enrollment.  Upon closing it underwent adaptive reuse as an apartment building.  In 1992 the Irving School was listed on the National Register of Historic Places for its local significance in the themes of architecture and education.  It was nominated for its early Renaissance Revival design by Palmer, Hall, & Hunt and for its association with the expansion and evolution of the Duluth school system.

See also
 National Register of Historic Places listings in St. Louis County, Minnesota

References

External links
 Irving School Apartments

1895 establishments in Minnesota
1982 disestablishments in Minnesota
Apartment buildings in Minnesota
Buildings and structures in Duluth, Minnesota
Defunct schools in Minnesota
Former school buildings in the United States
National Register of Historic Places in St. Louis County, Minnesota
Renaissance Revival architecture in Minnesota
School buildings completed in 1895
School buildings on the National Register of Historic Places in Minnesota
Schools in St. Louis County, Minnesota